James McDonald (born 18 April 1932) was a Scottish footballer. After playing junior football with Gourock,  he joined Dumbarton and after two seasons moved south of the border to Gillingham. He returned north the following season to join Morton.

References

1932 births
Living people
Scottish footballers
Dumbarton F.C. players
Gillingham F.C. players
Greenock Morton F.C. players
Scottish Football League players
English Football League players
Association football outside forwards